Kuleh Bayan (also Romanized as Kūleh Bayān, Kūlahbayān, and Kūleh Beyān; also known as Qulleh Biyān) is a village in Quri Chay Rural District, in the Central District of Dehgolan County, Kurdistan Province, Iran. At the 2006 census, it had a  population of 36, with 10 families. The village is populated by Kurds.

References 

Towns and villages in Dehgolan County
Kurdish settlements in Kurdistan Province